Alpine is a Northern Village of the Southern Highlands of New South Wales, Australia, in the Wingecarribee Shire. It is located north-east of Aylmerton and south of Yerrinbool. The Main Southern Line passes through the locality, and the Hume Highway runs along the western boundary. The Old South Road, an early precursor to the Hume Highway, runs through the centre of the locality, separating the rural western side from the Upper Nepean Catchment Area which is heavily forested.

Population
According to the 2021 census, the population of Alpine was 141.

References

Towns of the Southern Highlands (New South Wales)
Hume Highway